Kanzy Emad El Defrawy (born May 5, 1994) is an Egyptian squash player and Guinness World Record adjuncator, who formerly played the sport professionally. 

El Defrawy won her first Women's Squash Association Tour title at the NASH Cup in London, Ontario, Canada, in September 2014. In 2015, she won the Sentara Martha Jefferson Hospital Open and in 2016, won the Richmond Open, the Jordan Squash Federation Amman Open, the Play Squash Women's Open and the LiveStuff Open. During 2017, she has won the Delaware Women's Open and the Bahl and Gaynor Cincinnati Gaynor Cup.

El Defrawy started playing squash at seven years of age. She started to play internationally at 13, but had to undergo knee surgery aged 14 and had a difficult recovery from the surgery. She studied at Trinity College in Connecticut. El Defrawy won the Dutch Junior Open five times, the Pioneer Junior Open four times, the French and German Junior Opens once each, and the African and Arab Cups. She also won the U-19 World Championships twice.

El Defrawy no longer plays squash professionally. She lives in Dubai, where she works in the events industry.

References

External links 

1994 births
Living people
Egyptian female squash players
Sportspeople from Cairo
21st-century Egyptian women